Pelé Jerry Wabara Reid (born 11 January 1973, in Newtown, Birmingham) is a retired British heavyweight boxer. He currently resides in Birmingham, West Midlands and is a personal trainer. He is a former WBO Inter-Continental heavyweight champion and World Kick Boxing Champion.

In November 1993, he took part in the world amateur championship of WAKO, held at Atlantic City, New Jersey. He defeated William Eves (USA) by KO with his back-spin-kick at the final match of 89 kg class.

Reid and Dutchman William van Roosmalen are the only men ever to knock out boxing champion Vitali Klitschko in a kickboxing match. Reid managed to knock him out with a spinning back kick to the jaw.

Titles
Boxing
1997 W.B.O. Inter-Continental heavyweight title (1 title defence)
2009 British Masters Heavyweight title
Kickboxing
1993 W.A.K.O. World Championships in Atlantic City, USA  +89 kg (Light-Contact)
1992 W.A.K.O. European Championships in Varna, Bulgaria  +89 kg (Light-Contact)

Professional boxing record

Professional kickboxing record (incomplete)

Film work
In 2010, Reid was offered a role in the British comedy film On the Ropes. Director Mark Noyce chose Reid to fight Steve Coleman in a scene set at a martial arts competition.

In 2012, Reid teamed up with the trainer who worked with him for his British Masters title win at the company WBC Fight Club in his current home town of Chelmsley Wood. He offers motivational fitness training using his years of experience.

Personal life
Reid is the son of the Nigerian footballer Lawrence Wabara, and was named after the Brazilian footballer Pelé. He is the half-brother of Mark Walters, and uncle of the footballer Reece Wabara. He is now retired and is a dedicated Jehovah's Witness. In 2019 he wed a fellow Jehovah's Witness at a ceremony in Birmingham.

References

External links
 
 Profile at BritishBoxing.net

1973 births
Living people
English male boxers
Heavyweight boxers
English male kickboxers
Heavyweight kickboxers
Boxers from Birmingham, West Midlands
Prizefighter contestants
English sportspeople of Nigerian descent
English sportspeople of Jamaican descent